The Brother is a Canadian short documentary film, directed by Jérémie Battaglia and released in 2020. Blending live action with animation, the film tells a story of familial sacrifice and the bonds of brotherhood.

Synopsis 
Living with muscular dystrophy, a genetic disease that is causing him to lose the use of his body, Kaïs is awoken every morning by a different member of his family. While his body is paralyzed, at night he dreams that he is the hero of his favorite manga, along with his brothers, Fehd the bodybuilder and Zaid the ninja.

Awards 

The film won the first ever Prix Iris for Best Short Documentary at the 23rd Quebec Cinema Awards in 2021, and was a Canadian Screen Award nominee for Best Short Documentary at the 10th Canadian Screen Awards in 2022.

References

External links

2020 films
2020 short documentary films
Canadian short documentary films
Canadian animated documentary films
Documentary films about people with disability
French-language Canadian films
2020s Canadian films